Christ is a title given to Jesus, in his role as the Jewish Messiah in Christianity.

Christ also may refer to:

Religion
 Christ (title), a title for the saviour and redeemer who would bring salvation to the Jewish people and mankind
 Christ Child, Jesus as a child in the Holy Family
 Christ Pantocrator, a specific depiction of Christ, one of the names of God
 Michael (archangel), believed by some Christian faiths to be the preincarnate Jesus

Art, entertainment, and media
 Christ, Old English poetic triad:
 Christ I, anonymous collection of poems
 Christ II, poem by Cynewulf
 Christ III, anonymous poem
 Pensive Christ, a subject in Christian iconography

Music
 Christ 0, 2006 studio album of Vanden Plas
 Christ – The Album, Crass' fourth album, released in 1982
 Christ: The Bootleg, live recording by English punk rock band Crass
 Christ. (musician), Scottish  electronic music artist
 Christus (Liszt), an oratorio by Franz Liszt

Other uses
 Christ (surname)
 Christ Klep, Dutch military historian
 Christ Tshiunza (born 2002), rugby union player

See also
 Christos (disambiguation)
 Christus (disambiguation)
 Jesus (disambiguation)
 Jesus Christ (disambiguation)
 Jesus of Nazareth (disambiguation)
 Messiah (disambiguation)